Gerrit Rudolph (born 2 March 1988) is a South African-born Namibian cricketer. He made his first-class debut for the Namibian cricket team in 2007 against North West, and hit his first half-century for the team against Zimbabwe Provinces in January 2008.

Rudolph had previously played for Limpopo in the South African Airways Associates Challenge tournaments of 2005/06, 2006/07 and 2007/08. Rudolph's brother is South African cricketer Jacques Rudolph, who has played over thirty Tests for the national side.

External links
 Gerrit Rudolph at Cricket Archive 

1988 births
Living people
Cricketers from Pretoria
South African cricketers
Namibia cricketers
Limpopo cricketers